Eckerle is a surname.  According to Hanks, the surname is of South German origin and is a derivative of Eckert.  A pair of published genealogies indicate the surname arriving in the United States from Germanic territories.

Prevalence

United States 
The United States census provides resources related to the prevalence of surnames for its decennial national censuses.  In the 2010 census, "Eckerle" appeared 764 times, or 0.26 times per 100,000 people, having an overall rank of 30,538 and was associated primarily (95.55%) with white respondents.  In the 2000 census, the surname appeared 787 times, or 0.29 times per 100,000 people, having an overall rank of 28,522 and was associated primarily (96.82%) with white respondents.  In the 1990 census, the surname had a rank of 47,576.  As of 1997, "Eckerle" was found 320 times out of 88.7 million names (about 0.36 times per 100,000 people) in a commercially available electronic phone registry.

People with the surname

Dinah Eckerle (b. 1995), German handballer
Franz Eckerle (d. 1942), German World War II flying ace
Isabella Eckerle, German virologist
Jeff Eckerle (b. bef. 1996), American television producer and writer

Notes

References

German-language surnames